Haravanj (also Romanized as Harāvanj; also known as Kalāteh-ye Harāvanj) is a village in Zibad Rural District, Kakhk District, Gonabad County, Razavi Khorasan Province, Iran. At the 2006 census, its population was 29, in 7 families.

References 

Populated places in Gonabad County